The Encyclopedia of Pleasure or Jawāmiʿ al-Ladhdhah is the earliest existent Arabic erotic work, written in the 10th century by the medieval Arab writer Ali ibn Nasr al-Katib.

The work served as the inspiration for the sculpture made by Ghada Amer in 2001.

Contents
The Encyclopedia of Pleasure quotes and refers to several named and unnamed poets, writers, philosophers and physicians. One of the most famous and more frequently cited writers was Abu Nuwas.  Some consider him to be "the father of Arab erotic poetry". It also describes erotic gay and lesbian love.

The book contains an account of a 2nd-century Greek physician, Galen, that was recorded by medieval Arab writers. The physician examined his daughter, who was a lesbian, and concluded that her sexuality was "due to 'an itch between the labia majora and minora' that could be soothed only by rubbing them against another woman's labia".

The author then attempts to find a scientific explanation for lesbianism: "Lesbianism is due to a vapor which, condensed, generates in the labia heat and an itch which only dissolve and become cold through friction and orgasm. When friction and orgasm take place, the heat turns into coldness because the liquid that a woman ejaculates in lesbian intercourse is cold whereas the same liquid that results from sexual union with men is hot. Heat, however, cannot be extinguished by heat; rather, it will increase since it needs to be treated by its opposite. As coldness is repelled by heat, so heat is also repelled by coldness".

One of the stories told in the book is a story about the first Arab lesbian Hind Bint al-Khuss al-Iyadiyyah, known as al-Zarqa', and her love for the Christian woman Hind Bint al-Nu`man, who was the daughter of the last Lakhmid king of Hira in the 7th century. When Hind Bint al-Khuss al-Iyadiyyah died, her faithful lover "cropped her hair, wore black clothes, rejected worldly pleasures, vowed to God that she would lead an ascetic life until she passed away…"  She even built a monastery to commemorate her love for al-Zarqa'.

The Arabic version of the medieval text was originally published in Damascus as a part of Adab al-Jins 'Inda al-'Arab ("The Erotic Writings of the Arabs"). It is now difficult to find, and most extant copies are missing the chapters that deal with homosexuality. The omissions make the book difficult for many readers to understand. The English translation of the original Arabic version is much easier to find in Europe than in the Arab world.

Sculpture
Ghada Amer was fascinated with the fact that the Encyclopedia of Pleasure was widely accepted at the time it was written but was later forbidden in the Arab world. She has noted that although the book was written as a moral guide and combined the "literary, philosophical and medical knowledge" of the Islamic Golden Age was later "suppressed by conservative society". As Amer puts it: 

In 2001 Amer produced a large sculptural installation inspired by the Encyclopedia. She used an English translation of the book to place the text from the chapters that deal with female pleasure and beauty "On praiseworthy aesthetic qualities of women" and "On the advantages of a non-virgin over a virgin" on "57 canvas boxes, covered with Roman script embroidered in gold thread and stacked in various arrangements." The artist chose to blur some words and even some entire passages.  She intentionally did this because she believes that "the text of these passages is not important per se but acts merely as the visual framework for larger investigations of sexuality and spirituality and the role of the word within them."

In her work Amer quoted several sexually explicit texts:

By using such quotes, Amer demonstrated that in medieval Muslim society the women were not as "sexually repressed" as in the present time, and that their opinions on sexuality mattered.

A team of men and women constructed the sculpture in Egypt.

On 23 March 2007, it was used as a part of Global Feminism exhibit at the Center for Feminist Art at the Brooklyn Museum in New York.

See also
 A Promenade of the Hearts

References

Arabic erotic literature
10th-century Arabic books
Medieval Arabic literature
Arabic sex manuals